Keep Off the Grass is a musical revue with sketches by Mort Lewis, Parke Levy, Alan Lipscott, S. Jay Kaufman, and Panama & Frank, lyrics by Al Dubin and Howard Dietz, and music by Jimmy McHugh.  The choreography was by George Balanchine.
 
Produced by Lee Shubert and J. J. Shubert, the Broadway production, opened on May 23, 1940 at the Broadhurst Theatre and ran for a total of 44 performances. The cast included Jimmy Durante, Ray Bolger, Jane Froman, Virginia O'Brien, Emmett Kelly and Ilka Chase.  O'Brien recorded four of the songs for Columbia Records in 1940 and they are included as bonus tracks on her CD "Virginia O'Brien Salutes the Great MGM Musicals".

Songs

 The Cabby's Serenade
 This Is Spring
 Crazy  as a Loon
 A Fugitive from Esquire (lyrics by Howard Dietz)
 I'll Applaud (You) With My Feet
 Two in a Taxi (lyrics by Howard Dietz)
 Rhett, Scarlett & Ashley (lyrics by Howard Dietz)
 A Latin Tune, a Manhattan Moon, and You
 Clear Out of This World

 Look Out for My Heart
 (I'm an) Old Jitterbug
 I'm in the Mood
 Raffles (music by Vernon Duke)
 On the Old Park Bench (lyrics by Howard Dietz)
 This is Winter

Other uses

"Keep off the Grass" was an unreleased song by Big Audio Dynamite in the 1980s.
"Keep off the Grass" was a ragtime piece played by James P. Johnson in the 1920s.

External links
 
http://www.artistdirect.com/nad/store/artist/album/0,,3330719,00.html

1940 musicals
Broadway musicals
Revues